Dar Lasram is one of the palaces of the medina of Tunis. It is located at 24 Tribunal Street.

History 
The Lasram's, an aristocratic family of Tunis, descend from a Yemeni tribe settled in Kairouan. It is composed of rich landowners. Most of them were ministers of the Pen. One of them, Hamouda Lasram, is a rich landowner and a khawaja of the Igawawen tribe (secretary of Berber cavalry regiments).

In order to get a large plot and build the palace, he acquired and demolished several neighboring buildings. Its construction lasted from 1812 to 1819.

Until the independence and the abolition of the habous, his descendants lived in the palace (which was considered inalienable as a habous).

In 1964, the municipality of Tunis acquired it. Four years later, in 1968, it is allocated to the Association de sauvegarde de la médina de Tunis.

Architecture 
Dar Lasram, with a surface area of 2250 m2, is a good example of a large traditional Tunisian residence. The ground floor contains the warehouse and the service area, the first floor is reserved to family members while the upper floor is reserved to guests.

Nowadays, the palace is divided between the Association de sauvegarde de la médina and the Tahar Haddad Club.

References 

Lasram